Deh Kahan Rural District is a rural district (dehestan) in Central District, Kahnuj County, Kerman Province, Iran. At the 2006 census, its population was 9,476, in 2,014 families. The rural district has 30 villages.

References 

Rural Districts of Kerman Province
Kahnuj County